Guillaume de Gisors (1219–1307) was the son of Hugues III de Gisors and grandson of Jean de Gisors.

In popular culture

According to the genealogies in the Dossiers Secrets his sister married one "Jean des Plantard". They also state that Guillaume was inducted into the Order of the Ship and the Double Crescent in 1269. This order was created by Louis IX (Saint Louis) for nobles who accompanied him on the ill-fated Sixth Crusade.

In conspiracy theories, such as the one promoted in The Holy Blood and the Holy Grail, Guillaume de Gisors has been alleged to be the third Grand Master of the Priory of Sion (1266–1307).

See also 
Pierre Plantard
Rennes-le-Château

1219 births
1307 deaths